Vladimír Holík (born February 27, 1978) is a Czech former professional ice hockey defenceman.

Holík played in the Czech Extraliga for HC Slezan Opava, HC Havířov, HC Znojemští Orli and HC Vítkovice. He also played in the British National League for the Edinburgh Capitals, the Slovak 1. Liga for HC '05 Banská Bystrica and in France for seven years with Brest Albatros Hockey and Sangliers Arvernes de Clermont.

Career statistics

References

External links

1978 births
Living people
HC '05 Banská Bystrica players
HC Benátky nad Jizerou players
Brest Albatros Hockey players
Czech ice hockey defencemen
Edinburgh Capitals players
HC Havířov players
Orli Znojmo players
HC Slezan Opava players
Sportspeople from Opava
Hokej Šumperk 2003 players
HC Vítkovice players
Czech expatriate ice hockey players in Slovakia
Czech expatriate sportspeople in Scotland
Czech expatriate sportspeople in France
Czech expatriate ice hockey people
Expatriate ice hockey players in Scotland